Verdad may refer to:

Verdad (1950), Uruguay 
Louis Verdad, American fashion designer

See also 
 La Verdad (disambiguation)